Bexley Football Club is a football club based in Bexley, London, England. They are currently members of the Kent County League Division One West.

History
Bexley were formed in 1884, becoming registered with the Football Association in 1886. In 1927, Bexley became a senior club. In the 1939–40 season, Bexley entered the FA Cup for the first time, beating Gravesend United 3–1, however their progress in the cup was halted due to World War II. On 24 May 1946, Bexley amalgamated Bexley United into the club. In 1965, Bexley joined the Greater London League, becoming founder members of the London Spartan League in 1975, leaving the league in 1982. In 2010, Bexley joined the Kent County League from the South London Football Alliance, winning promotion to the Premier Division in 2015. In 2019, the club was relegated to the Division One West.

Ground

The club currently play at St Mary's Recreation Ground in Bexley.

Records
Best FA Cup performance: Preliminary round, 1947–48
Best FA Vase performance: Second round, 1974–75

References

Association football clubs established in 1884
1884 establishments in England
Football clubs in England
Football clubs in London
Sport in the London Borough of Bexley
Greater London League
Spartan League
Southern Counties East Football League
South London Football Alliance
Kent County League